Grace Lantz ( Boyle, November 7, 1903 – March 17, 1992), also known by her stage name Grace Stafford, was an American actress and the wife of animation producer Walter Lantz. Stafford is best known for providing the voice of Woody Woodpecker, a creation of Lantz's, from 1950 to 1992.

Career
Stafford appeared in feature live-action films from 1935's Dr. Socrates to 1975's Doc Savage: The Man of Bronze. Some of her more notable roles were in the films Anthony Adverse and Blossoms in the Dust.

Around the time the Woody Woodpecker short Drooler's Delight was in production, Mel Blanc, who had originally supplied Woody's voice and laugh, filed a lawsuit against producer Walter Lantz, claiming that Lantz had used his voice in later cartoons without permission. The judge, however, ruled for Lantz, saying that Blanc had failed to copyright his voice or his contributions. Though Lantz won the case, he paid Blanc in an out-of-court settlement when Blanc filed an appeal. Wanting to avoid any future retaliation from voice artists wanting to sue him, Lantz opted to find a new voice actor to replace Ben Hardaway as Woody's talking voice, as well as a definitive version of the laugh for his star woodpecker.

In 1950, Lantz held anonymous auditions. Stafford offered to do Woody's voice, but Lantz turned her down because Woody was a male character. Not discouraged in the least, Grace made her own anonymous audition tape and submitted it to Walter Lantz Productions. Not knowing who was behind the voice he heard, Lantz picked Grace's voice for Woody Woodpecker. Stafford provided Woody's voice from 1950 to 1992. At first, she asked not to be credited in the role, as she believed that audiences both young and old would be "disillusioned" if they knew Woody was voiced by a woman. But she soon came to enjoy being known as Woody's voice and, starting with 1958's Misguided Missile, finally allowed her name to be credited on screen.

Stafford also appeared on an episode of What's My Line? on November 10, 1963.

Death
Gracie Lantz died of spinal cancer on March 17, 1992, at age 88.

Filmography

 Dr. Socrates (1935) as Caroline Suggs
 I Married a Doctor (1936) as Vera Sherwin
 Anthony Adverse (1936) as Lucia
 The Man Who Dared (1939) as Mary McCrary
 Confessions of a Nazi Spy (1939) as Mrs. Schneider
 The Greener Hills (1939, Short) as Harriet Miller
 Indianapolis Speedway (1939) as Martha Connors
 Hawaiian Nights (1939) as Secretary (uncredited)
 Blondie Brings Up Baby (1939) as Miss White
 Flight Angels (1940) as Buxton
 I Can't Give You Anything But Love, Baby (1940) as Second Operator (uncredited)
 La Conga Nights (1940) as Secretary (uncredited)
 Margie (1940) as Miss Bradley
 A Dispatch from Reuter's (1940) as Woman Dancing with Geller (uncredited)
 Santa Fe Trail (1940) as Farmer's Wife (uncredited)
 Model Wife (1941) as Miss Manahan (uncredited)
 Affectionately Yours (1941) as Miss Anderson
 Blossoms In the Dust (1941) as Molly (uncredited)
 Unfinished Business (1941) as Woman (uncredited)
 Dr. Kildare's Victory (1942) as Mrs. Betty Richards (uncredited)
 What's Cookin'? (1942) as Bob's Assistant (uncredited)
 Larceny, Inc. (1942) as McCarthy's Secretary (uncredited)
 You're Telling Me (1942) as Switchboard Operator (uncredited)
 Destination Moon (1950) as Woody Woodpecker (voice, uncredited)
 Lotsa Luck (1968) as Woody Woodpecker (voice)
 Let Charlie Do It (1972) (voice)
 Doc Savage: The Man of Bronze (1975) as Little Lady (final film role)

References

External links

 
 

1903 births
1992 deaths
American film actresses
American voice actresses
Neurological disease deaths in California
Deaths from cancer in California
Deaths from spinal cancer
Actresses from New York City
People from Greater Los Angeles
Burials at Forest Lawn Memorial Park (Hollywood Hills)
20th-century American actresses
Walter Lantz Productions people